

Cooltong Conservation Park is a protected area located in South Australia about  west of the town of Renmark in the Riverland of South Australia. The conservation park was proclaimed under the National Parks and Wildlife Act 1972 in 1993 to "preserve quality mallee vegetation and habitat for the mallee bird species that frequent the area, in particular the Malleefowl." As of 2011, the conservation park was described as being "dominated by mallee vegetation, with undulating dunes and shales" and that it is "popular among birdwatchers eager to catch a glimpse of elusive mallee birds." Services provided within the conservation park as of 2011 include bushwalking, picnic grounds and vehicle tracks only accessible by 4WD vehicles. The conservation park is classified as an IUCN Category VI protected area.

See also
 Protected areas of South Australia
 Riverland Biosphere Reserve
 Riverland Mallee Important Bird Area

References

External links
Entry for Cooltong Conservation Park on Protected Planet

Conservation parks of South Australia
Protected areas established in 1993
1993 establishments in Australia
Murray Mallee
Riverland